
Gmina Sędziejowice is a rural gmina (administrative district) in Łask County, Łódź Voivodeship, in central Poland.

Villages
Gmina Sędziejowice contains the villages and settlements of Bilew, Brody, Brzeski, Dobra, Grabia, Grabia Trzecia, Grabica, Grabno, Kamostek, Korczyska, Kustrzyce, Lichawa, Marzenin, Niecenia, Nowe Kozuby, Osiny, Podule, Pruszków, Przymiłów, Rososza, Sędziejowice, Sędziejowice-Kolonia, Siedlce, Sobiepany, Stare Kozuby, Wola Marzeńska, Wola Wężykowa, Wrzesiny, Żagliny and Zamość.

Neighbouring gminas
Gmina Sędziejowice is bordered by the gminas of Buczek, Łask, Widawa, Zapolice, Zduńska Wola and Zelów.

References
 Polish official population figures 2006

Sedziejowice
Łask County